József Keresztessy (19 September 1885 – 29 December 1962) was a Hungarian gymnast who competed in the 1912 Summer Olympics.

Keresztessy was born in Budapest.  He was part of the Hungarian team which won the silver medal in the gymnastics men's team, European system event in 1912.  He died in Toronto, Canada.

References

External links
profile
profile 

1885 births
1962 deaths
Gymnasts from Budapest
Hungarian male artistic gymnasts
Gymnasts at the 1912 Summer Olympics
Olympic gymnasts of Hungary
Olympic silver medalists for Hungary
Olympic medalists in gymnastics
Hungarian emigrants to Canada
Medalists at the 1912 Summer Olympics